The canton of Faches-Thumesnil is an administrative division of the Nord department, northern France. It was created at the French canton reorganisation which came into effect in March 2015. Its seat is in Faches-Thumesnil.

It consists of the following communes:

Chemy
Emmerin
Faches-Thumesnil
Gondecourt
Haubourdin
Herrin
Houplin-Ancoisne
Noyelles-lès-Seclin
Seclin
Templemars
Vendeville
Wattignies

References

Cantons of Nord (French department)